The Ohio Naval Militia (Ohio Navy) is the naval militia of the State of Ohio. It is the naval arm of the State of Ohio's Adjutant General's Department, and is part of Ohio's military forces.

Their operational headquarters are on the Camp Perry Joint Training Center, in Port Clinton, Ohio, on the shores of Lake Erie.

Members, who range from 17–67 years old, typically drill one weekend a month and one "short" week in the summer.  From the months of April, through November, the drills consist primarily of patrolling the impact area of Lake Erie immediately adjacent to Camp Perry's firing range.

History

On March 1, 1896, an act was passed by the Ohio General Assembly providing for the organization of two battalions to be known as the Naval Brigade of the National Guard of Ohio.  Without funds for outfitting or maintenance, they mustered in Toledo in July and through further organization, one battalion was located in Cleveland and one in Toledo.

In 1898, the United States Congress declared war against Spain.  In an effort to get Spain out of Cuba, President William McKinley was authorized to use all land and naval forces, as well as militia to enforce Congressional demands.  At this time, the naval forces in the State of Ohio became the Ohio Naval Militia (ONM).  The Ohio Naval Militia participated in the war, fighting as part of the 10th Ohio Volunteer Infantry.

The ONM later purchased the old revenue cutter Andrew Johnson, which was refitted accordingly. The first training was at Johnson's Island in Sandusky Bay in July 1897.

In 1936, a new Naval Militia Armory, located in Bayview Park in Toledo and built by the WPA was dedicated.  It served the needs of the ONM until 1947 when it was taken over by the newly formed U.S. Naval Reserve.

The ONM was deactivated following World War II, and remained so for nearly 30 years.  In 1974, the former lieutenant governor, John W. Brown began the process of reactivating the Ohio Naval Militia; and on November 1, 1977 the ONM was reactivated with John W. Brown as the first commandant.

In 2020, the Ohio Naval Militia was activated alongside the Ohio National Guard and the Ohio Military Reserve to take part in Operation Steady Resolve, the name given to the National Guard's mission to combat the COVID-19 pandemic.

Mission

The ONM assists in natural disasters or other emergencies, as called upon by the governor or the Adjutant General.

Their active mission is to patrol the government impact area off Camp Perry, in the waters of Lake Erie. It is a live-fire area that requires keeping pleasure boaters and fishermen from entering.  By patrolling the impact area, the ONM provides support for the Ohio National Guard and other state and federal military units as they perform weapons qualifications prior to deploying.

By conducting continuous training on their boats and in the classroom, members have the opportunity to become coxswains (boat operators) and boat crew.  ONM members also receive basic boating education training to prepare for certification by the Ohio Division of Watercraft.  They teach basic navigation, radio communications, boat handling, maintenance, boating safety, and boating support functions.  All ONM training hours are documented and can be applied toward obtaining a captain's license from the U.S. Coast Guard.

Organization

The Ohio Naval Militia is an organized all volunteer State Defense Force, which serves under the direction of the Governor of the State of Ohio as Commander in Chief through the office of the Adjutant General.  They are governed by Ohio Revised Code chapters 5921, 5923, and 5924.

Command:
 CO - COMMANDANT – CAPT Bethany Carpenter
 XO - EXECUTIVE OFFICER - CDR Kurt McClurg
 CMC - COMMAND MASTER CHIEF - CMDCM (SW) Damian D. Myers

Legal protection
Under Ohio law, members of the Ohio Naval Militia are guaranteed the same employment rights and protections as federal reservists enjoy under the Uniformed Services Employment and Reemployment Rights Act (USERRA). Among other legal rights guaranteed under this provision, Ohio Naval Militia members are protected from discrimination based on their membership in the Ohio Naval Militia both during the hiring process and after becoming employed; they are also guaranteed a leave of absence from their places of employment whenever they are activated for training or to take part in an emergency, and their employers are required to reinstate these employees to their previous positions when they return from deployment.

See also
 Ohio Military Reserve
 United States Coast Guard Auxiliary

References

External links
 Ohio Naval Militia
 Official State of Ohio Web site

State defense forces of the United States
Military in Ohio